Dovinė  is a river of  Marijampolė County and Alytus County, southern Lithuania. It flows for 47 kilometres and has a basin area of 588.7 km².

It is a right tributary of the river Šešupė.

References

Rivers of Lithuania
Alytus District Municipality